Orchidelirium, also called orchidomania or orchid fever, is the name given to the Victorian era of flower madness when collecting and discovering orchids reached extraordinarily high levels. Wealthy orchid fanatics of the 19th century sent explorers and collectors to almost every part of the world in search of new varieties of orchids. Orchidelirium is seen as similar to Dutch tulip mania. Today there still exists some levels of orchid madness, that has some times resulted in theft of exceptional orchids among collectors such as the Ghost Orchid.

History 
Cultivation of orchids started in England in the 19th century. Orchids were brought to Europe by companies or individuals who had financed collecting expeditions. Initially orchidelirium was a craze limited to the European upper classes. A difficult plant to grow in cold or even temperate climates, the rich spent a fortune on orchids that died in unsuitable conditions, generally with waterlogged roots in stifling hot greenhouses. Commissioned professional collectors would travel for months all over the world in search of rare new species. It was dangerous work, often romanticised. Many died on these expeditions, from misadventure or conflict with locals, and rival orchid-hunters engaged in willfully destructive behaviours, such as urinating on the plants collected by their rivals after stripping the rest of the habitat bare.  These expensive expeditions were often shrouded in secrecy and it was not unusual for collectors to spread misleading information about the locations where new orchids were found. New exotic orchids were most often sold at auction in London, fetching extravagant prices. During this time very little was known about the cultivation of orchids and their survival rate was dismal. Through experimentation and by gathering more information on the growing conditions of orchids in their natural habitat, knowledge was slowly being developed and by 1851 B.S. Williams published the first edition of The Orchid Grower’s Manual (London 1871). 

Today, international trading of orchids harvested in the wild is now banned by the Convention on International Trade in Endangered Species of Wild Fauna and Flora (CITES) adopted in 1973. Still many orchid species are endangered. Orchid smuggling is thought to contribute to the loss of some species of orchid in the wild.

See also 
 Moyobamba, known as the 'City of Orchids', which has some 3,500 species of orchid native to the area
 Orchid hunters
 The Orchid Thief, a non-fiction book written by Susan Orlean
 Adaptation., a movie based on the Susan Orlean book The Orchid Thief
 Nero Wolfe, a fictional detective and orchidophile
 Tulip mania, a period in the Dutch Golden Age during which prices for bulbs of the newly introduced tulip reached extraordinarily high levels

References 

Orchid cultivation
Orchidology
19th-century fads and trends
Victorian era
Collecting